12 teams took part in the league with FC Dynamo Moscow winning the championship.

League standings

Results

Top scorers
16 goals
 Zaur Kaloyev (Dinamo Tbilisi)

14 goals
 Viktor Sokolov (Lokomotiv Moscow)

11 goals
 Tengiz Melashvili (Dinamo Tbilisi)

10 goals
 Valentin Bubukin (Lokomotiv Moscow)

9 goals
 German Apukhtin (CSK MO Moscow)
 Yuri Korotkov (Moldova Kishinyov)
 Viktor Ponedelnik (SKVO Rostov-on-Don)

8 goals
 Genrikh Fedosov (Dynamo Moscow)
 Anatoli Isayev (Spartak Moscow)
 Dmitri Shapovalov (Dynamo Moscow)

References

 Soviet Union - List of final tables (RSSSF)

Soviet Top League seasons
1
Soviet
Soviet